The Weddell Polynya, or Weddell Sea Polynya, is a polynya or irregular area of open water surrounded by sea ice in the Weddell Sea of the Southern Ocean off Antarctica and near the Maud Rise. The formation of the polynya exposes relatively warmer ocean waters (at surface freezing temperatures of -1.9°C) to a cold atmosphere, leading to a large exchange of heat which drives deep convection in the ocean, often reaching depths of a 1,000 to 2,000 meters!

Occurrences
The size of New Zealand, it re-occurred each winter between 1974 and 1976. These were the first three austral winters observed by the Nimbus-5 Electrically Scanning Microwave Radiometer (ESMR). From 1976 to 2015 this polynya was rarely observed. The polynya reoccurred in 2016, and has since appeared in 2017.

Since the 1970s, the polar Southern Ocean south of the Antarctic Circumpolar Current has freshened and stratified, likely a result of anthropogenic climate change. Such stratification may be responsible for suppressing the return of the Weddell Sea polynya.

More recently, it was found that intense cyclones occurring over the ice pack, far south from the ice edge, were at the origin of the reoccurrence of the Weddell or Maud Rise Polynya in austral winter 2017. In certain winter months, the general atmospheric circulation around Antarctica exhibits a strong zonal wave 3 pattern which favor the development of polar cyclones closer to the coast i.e. over preconditioned oceanographic areas for polynya formation such as the Weddell Polynya in the Lazarev Sea and the Cosmonaut polynya in the Cosmonaut Sea around Antarctica.

Other Antarctic polynyas
The presence of polynyas in McMurdo Sound provides an ice-free area where penguins can feed, so is important for the survival of the Cape Royds penguin colony.

See also
Polar Cyclones
Coriolis force
 Ekman layer
 Ekman number
 Ekman spiral
 Ekman transport
 Ekman velocity
 Fridtjof Nansen
 Nansen's Fram expedition
 Upwelling
 Vagn Walfrid Ekman

References 

Geography of the Southern Ocean
Bodies of water of the Southern Ocean